Leimer is a surname. Notable people with the surname include:

Connor Leimer (born 1996), American singer-songwriter
Fabio Leimer (born 1989), Swiss racing driver
Karl Leimer (1858–1944) was a German music teacher and pianist
K. Leimer (Kerry Leimer), American electronic musician
Kurt Leimer (1920–1974), German concert pianist, composer and piano instructor